Vera Perostiyska (born May 25, 1982) is a former Bulgarian professional basketball player. She is one of the most successful basketball players from Plovdiv, Bulgaria. She has competed in ten different leagues throughout her professional career. Perostiyska was a longtime member of the Bulgarian National team, where she was selected team captain in 2012. She graduated from Florida International University in 2004.

External links
Profile at eurobasket.com

1982 births
Living people
Sportspeople from Plovdiv
Bulgarian women's basketball players
Centers (basketball)